France participated in the Eurovision Song Contest 2007 with the song "L'amour à la française" written by Ivan Callot, Paul Léger and Laurent Honel. The song was performed by les Fatals Picards. The French broadcaster France Télévisions in collaboration with the television channels France 2, France 3, France 4, France 5 and RFO organised the national final Eurovision 2007 : et si on gagnait ? in order to select the French entry for the 2007 contest in Helsinki, Finland. Ten songs competed in the national final on 6 March 2007 where the winner was selected over two rounds of voting. In the first round, two entries were selected to advance to the second round following the combination of votes from a jury panel and a public vote. In the second round, "L'amour à la française" performed by les Fatals Picards was selected as the winner following the combination of votes from the jury and public vote.

As a member of the "Big Four", France automatically qualified to compete in the final of the Eurovision Song Contest. Performing in position 13, France placed twenty-second out of the 24 participating countries with 19 points.

Background 

France first won the contest in 1958 with "Dors, mon amour" performed by André Claveau. In the 1960s, they won three times, with "Tom Pillibi" performed by Jacqueline Boyer in 1960, "Un premier amour" performed by Isabelle Aubret in 1962 and "Un jour, un enfant" performed by Frida Boccara, who won in 1969 in a four-way tie with the Netherlands, Spain and the United Kingdom. France's fifth victory came in 1977, when Marie Myriam won with the song "L'oiseau et l'enfant". France have also finished second four times, with Paule Desjardins in 1957, Catherine Ferry in 1976, Joëlle Ursull in 1990 and Amina in 1991, who lost out to Sweden's Carola in a tie-break. In the 21st century, France has had less success, only making the top ten two times, with Natasha St-Pier finishing fourth in 2001 and Sandrine François finishing fifth in 2002. In 2006, the nation finished in twenty-second place with the song "Il était temps" performed by Virginie Pouchain.

The French national broadcaster, France Télévisions, broadcasts the event within France and delegates the selection of the nation's entry to the television channel France 3. France 3 confirmed that France would participate in the 2007 Eurovision Song Contest on 16 May 2006. The French broadcaster had used both national finals and internal selection to choose the French entry in the past. From 2001 to 2004, the broadcaster opted to internally select the French entry. The 2005 and 2006 French entries were selected via a national final, a procedure that was continued in order to select the 2007 entry.

Before Eurovision

Eurovision 2007 : et si on gagnait ? 
Eurovision 2007 : et si on gagnait ? was the national final organised by France Télévisions in collaboration with the five broadcaster channels: France 2, France 3, France 4, France 5 and overseas territories broadcaster RFO to select France's entry for the Eurovision Song Contest 2007. The competition took place on 6 March 2007 at the La Plaine St-Denis studios in Paris, hosted by Julien Lepers and Tex. The show was broadcast on France 3 as well as online via the broadcaster channel's official website france3.fr. The national final was watched by 2.02 million viewers in France with a market share of 8.7%.

Competing entries 
France Télévisions received 1,500 submissions after the broadcaster requested proposals from successful French acts over the last five years. The television channels of the French broadcaster France 2, France 3, France 4, France 5 and RFO reviewed the received submissions and each selected two entries to compete in the national final based on individual criteria: variety for France 2, newcomers for France 3, rap and rock music for France 4, pop music for France 5 and world music for RFO. One of the competing artists from the RFO selection, Valérie Louri, was selected via the musical programme 9 Semaines et 1 Jour. The competing artists and songs were announced on 2 February 2007. On 7 February 2007, the artists presented their entries to the public during an introductory event held at the Le Réservoir in Paris.

Final 
The final took place on 6 March 2007. Ten entries competed and the winner was selected over two rounds of voting. In the first round, the top two entries as determined by the combination of public televoting (50%) and a jury panel headed by songwriter Jean-Paul Cara (50%) advanced to the second round, the superfinal. In the superfinal, the winner, "L'amour à la française" performed by les Fatals Picards, was determined by the public and jury vote. The winning song was performed using Franglais, a mixture of French and English, and according to the songwriters meant to combine French romance and punk for beginners.

In addition to the performances of the competing entries, French Eurovision Song Contest 1977 winner Marie Myriam performed her winning song "L'oiseau et l'enfant" as the interval act of the show.

At Eurovision
According to Eurovision rules, all nations with the exceptions of the host country, the "Big Four" (France, Germany, Spain and the United Kingdom) and the ten highest placed finishers in the 2006 contest are required to qualify from the semi-final in order to compete for the final; the top ten countries from the semi-final progress to the final. As a member of the "Big 4", France automatically qualified to compete in the final on 12 May 2007. In addition to their participation in the final, France is also required to broadcast and vote in the semi-final on 10 May 2007.

In France, the semi-final was broadcast on France 4 with commentary by Peggy Olmi and Yann Renoard, while the final was broadcast on France 3 with commentary by Julien Lepers and Tex, as well as via radio on France Bleu with commentary by Yves Derisbourg. The French spokesperson, who announced the French votes during the final, was Vanessa Dolmen.

Final 

Les Fatals Picards took part in technical rehearsals on 7 and 8 May, followed by dress rehearsals on 11 and 12 May. During the running order draw for the semi-final and final on 12 March 2007, France was placed to perform in position 13 in the final, following the entry from Sweden and before the entry from Latvia.

The French performance featured the members of les Fatals Picards on stage in a band set-up dressed in retro black and pink outfits, including the addition of the white wings of Cupid on the band drummer Jean-Marc Sauvagnargues's back and a faux object on the shoulder of lead singer Ivan Callot. During the performance, the members of les Fatals Picards performed frantic actions, including running about the stage. The stage colours were predominately pink and the LED screens displayed a collage of candy pink and white roses with graphics of the Eiffel Tower and Notre Dame fading in and out over the roses. France placed twenty-second in the final, scoring 19 points.

Voting 
Below is a breakdown of points awarded to France and awarded by France in the semi-final and grand final of the contest. The nation awarded its 12 points to Turkey in the semi-final and final of the contest.

Points awarded to France

Points awarded by France

References

External links
French National Final page
 eurovision-info.net, french database

2007
Countries in the Eurovision Song Contest 2007
Eurovision
Eurovision